Orthotaenia undulana is a moth of the family Tortricidae. It is found in the Palearctic realm.

The wingspan is 15–20 mm. It is light, beige and white with dark areas. When resting on a surface, it is well camouflaged and can resemble a bird's dropping. The ground color of the forewings is brownish or grayish, There is a light cross-band with fine brown lines. The wing tip is mostly white, but has small brown striae and spots and a larger brown mark along the outer edge. The hindwings are light brown.

The moth flies from May to mid-August.

The larvae feed on honeysuckle, Vaccinium, pine and birch.

Notes
The flight season refers to Belgium and the Netherlands. This may vary in other parts of the range.

External links
 waarneming.nl  
 Lepidoptera of Belgium
 Orthotaenia undulana at UKMoths

Olethreutinae
Moths of Japan
Tortricidae of Europe
Insects of Turkey